Danny Jung (born 5 August 1971) is a former Danish football player and current manager of FC Helsingør's U19s.

Career
Jung played at several Danish Superliga clubs. He had five spells at his childhood club B93 representing the club 91 times and scoring 33 goals.

In 2004, he became joint manager of B93 with Dan Lübbers. He lasted eight months in that job.

In November 2016 he was made new manager of Boldklubben Frem effective from January 2017. He left in August 2017 on mutual consent following a bad start to the 2017–18 season.

In December 2017 it was announced that Jung would return as manager of B93 in January 2018. He left the club in November 2019. On 30 June 2020, he was appointed head coach of FC Helsingør's U19 team.

References

External links 
B93 Profile
DBU Profile

1973 births
Living people
Danish men's footballers
Danish Superliga players
Boldklubben af 1893 players
Boldklubben Frem players
Herfølge Boldklub players
Vejle Boldklub players
Danish football managers
Boldklubben af 1893 managers
Boldklubben Frem managers
Association football forwards
Ølstykke FC players
Footballers from Copenhagen